Mary Karen Campbell is an American former competitive ice dancer. With her skating partner, Johnny Johns, she became the 1971 North American bronze medalist, 1972 Nebelhorn Trophy champion, and 1973 U.S. national champion.

Results
Ice dance with Johns:

References

Navigation

American female ice dancers
Living people
Year of birth missing (living people)